"Talk It Over in the Morning" is a single by Canadian country pop artist Anne Murray. Released in August 1971, it was the first single from her album Talk It Over in the Morning. It peaked at number 1 on the RPM Country Tracks chart.

Chart performance

References

1971 singles
Anne Murray songs
Songs written by Paul Williams (songwriter)
Songs written by Roger Nichols (songwriter)
1971 songs